The River Bleng is a tributary of the River Irt in the county of Cumbria in northern England.

The river gives its name to the valley that it flows through which is called Blengdale. It is thought that the name Bleng is derived from the Old Norse word blaeingr, which translates as dark water, so Blengdale would mean the valley of the dark river.

The river rises at Stockdale Head in the Lake District, it then flows south and then east towards for  its confluence with the River Irt. The Bleng only passes through one village - Wellington, near Gosforth, Cumbria.

Tributaries
Ongue Gill
Ill Gill
Swinsty Beck
Star Beck
Skalderskew Beck
Scale Beck
Hale Beck

References

Bleng, River
2Bleng